The 1921 Constitution of the Azerbaijan Socialist Soviet Republic (Konstitutsiya Azerbaydzhanskoy Sotsialisticheskoy Sovetskoy Respubliki) was adopted by the Central Executive Committee of the Azerbaijan SSR at the 1st All-Azerbaijani Congress of Soviets on 19 May 1921. The constitution abolished the Azerbaijan Democratic Republic.

The constitution bears a great resemblance to the 1918 Constitution of the Russian SFSR.

Background 
On 6 May 1921, the First All-Azerbaijan Congress of Soviets was convened. The most important issues included in the agenda were the adoption of the Constitution and the formation of the supreme power body. The draft of the first Azerbaijan SSR constitution was discussed during the Congress and was unanimously adopted at 19 May 1921, at the final meeting of the Congress. The Constitution has established that the Soviet system was created in Azerbaijan and that the interests and rights of the workers were protected. The constitution, which defined Azerbaijan as a Soviet Republic, was considered by the Congress as the most democratic political form.

Structure 
The Constitution is divided into 5 sections and 15 chapters. The constitution consisted of 104 verses.

Section One: General Provisions of the Constitution of the Azerbaijan SSR
This sections contains no chapters.

Section Two: The Construction of the Soviet Government
A. Organization of the Central Government
About the Azerbaijan Congress of Soviets
About the Central Executive Committee of the Azerbaijan SSR
About the Presidium of the Central Executive Committee of the Azerbaijan SSR
About the subjects of the Azerbaijani Soviet Congress and the Soviet of the Central Executive Committee of the Azerbaijan SSR
About the Council of People's Commissars
B. Organization of the Regional Government
About the Soviet Congress
About the Soviet Deputies
About the Executive Committees
About the subjects of management of the Soviet government bodies

Section Three: Elections of the Soviet Government
Active and passive suffrage
About the candidates of the election
About the validation of elections and on the dismissal of deputies

Section Four: Budget Laws 
This sections contains no chapters.

Section Five: About the Flag and the Emblem of the Azerbaijan Socialist Soviet Republic 
This sections contains no chapters.

Amendments 
After the promulgation of the constitution, there were some events that readjusted the status of Azerbaijan SSR. On 1922, Azerbaijan entered two state bodies, the Transcaucasian Soviet Federative Socialist Republic and the USSR. Two years later, the Nakhchivan Autonomous Soviet Socialist Republic was placed under the jurisdiction of the Azerbaijan SSR. Other events are the territorial formation of NKVD in Azerbaijan, the renewal of the structure and activities of a number of state bodies, private law enforcement agencies, the administrative-territorial division of the republic, as well as the structure of the state apparatus. Prompted by the events, the government of the Azerbaijan SSR adopted several amendments to the constitution on March 14, 1925.

Provisions

Basic Rights 
Freedom of speech and press, meetings, rallies, street freedoms, freedom of conscience, equality of rights regardless of national, racial or religious affiliation, right to association in public organizations, free, general and compulsory education right were included in this Constitution. Along with the granting of rights and freedoms and their enforcement, the Constitution imposed certain obligations on citizens. Employment was an important task.

Election 
While the constitution defines equality, some categories of individuals have deprived the right to vote.

Central Executive Committee 
The constitution defines the main principles of the organization and functioning of the state apparatus. The organization and operation of the higher authorities and governing bodies of Azerbaijan, as well as the local state authorities, were detailed. The first Constitution of Azerbaijan defines the All-Azerbaijani Congress of Soviets, the Central Executive Committee of the Azerbaijan SSR and the Presidium of the CEC of Azerbaijan SSR as the supreme state power bodies of the republic. According to the Constitution, these bodies exercise full state power, ensuring its supremacy and independence. Among the Supreme Authorities, the Workers' Council of the Soviet Union occupied an important place among the working class deputies.

During the All-Azerbaijani Congress of Soviets, the authority was held by the Central Executive Committee (CEC) of the Azerbaijan SSR. The CEC must convene at least once every two months.

The composition of the Central Executive Committee of the Azerbaijan SSR commissions changed after Azerbaijan was incorporated into the Transcaucasian SFSR and the USSR and the relevant changes in the authority of the republic. External affairs, defense, and foreign trade issues were excluded from the exclusive competence of the USSR, and foreign and marine maritime commissions were abolished, and the Commission for Foreign and Domestic Trade was renamed to the Commission for Commerce Affairs.

On the sessions of the Central Executive Committee, the supreme state power body was the Presidium of the Central Executive Committee. The composition included the chairman, secretary and members of the Central Executive Committee. Later, in addition to standing members, the Central Executive Committee's Presidium included the Nakhchivan Autonomous Republic Council of Ministers and the Chairman of the Regional Executive Committee of the Nakhchivan Autonomous Republic, the chairman of the Baku Council and the Chairman of the Emergency Committee.

Council of People's Commissars 
The implementation of the constitution and the management of general affairs of the Azerbaijan SSR was handed over to the Council of People's Commissars. The members of the Council of People's Commissars was elected by the Central Executive Committee. The council consisted of the chairman, deputy, and the people commissars. In the following years, the composition of the government expanded.

References

Citations

Bibliography 

Azerbaijan Soviet Socialist Republic
1921 in Azerbaijan
Law of Azerbaijan
1921 in law
1921 documents
Azerbaijan